A double referendum was held in Transnistria on 24 December 1995. Voters were asked whether they approved of a new constitution and membership of the Commonwealth of Independent States. The new constitution provided for a parliamentary republic, a bicameral parliament and obligatory referendums for amending sections I, II and IV of the constitution. Both proposals were approved by over 80% of voters.

Results

New constitution

CIS membership

References

Referendums in Transnistria
Referendums in Moldova
1995 in Moldova
1995 in Transnistria
1995 referendums
Constitutional referendums